The 1985 NCAA Division I Field Hockey Championship was the fifth women's collegiate field hockey tournament organized by the National Collegiate Athletic Association, to determine the top college field hockey team in the United States. The Connecticut Huskies won their second championship, defeating the three-time defending champions, the Old Dominion Lady Monarchs, in the final. The championship rounds were held at Foreman Field in Norfolk, Virginia.

Bracket

References 

1985
Field Hockey
1985 in women's field hockey
1985 in sports in Virginia
Women's sports in Virginia